Ángel O. Berríos Díaz (September 21, 1940 – April 28, 2006) was a native of Caguas, Puerto Rico. An engineer of profession, Berríos became the 22nd mayor of Caguas in 1973, after winning the 1972 elections, as a member of the Popular Democratic Party (PPD).

Berrios was defeated in the 1976 elections by the New Progressive Party candidate Miguel Hernández, but he came back on top during the 1980 elections. After being sworn back to office in 1981, he began a period of 16 years in a row as mayor of Caguas. During his tenure, new hospitals, malls, department stores and housing complexes were built.

Berríos became the managing owner of the Criollos de Caguas basketball team in 1987, and, later on, acquired the Criollas de Caguas women's volleyball team.

Berríos decided not to run for mayor again in 1996, being substituted by William Miranda Marín as PPD leader in Caguas. Miranda Marín went on to win the elections that year.

Later on, an entertainment center was named after Berríos, the Centro de Bellas Artes Ángel O. Berríos.

Berríos died on April 28, 2006, due to complications of a stroke which had occurred six months prior. He was buried at Cementerio Borinquen Memorial Park I in Caguas, Puerto Rico.

References 

1940 births
2006 deaths
Mayors of places in Puerto Rico
Popular Democratic Party (Puerto Rico) politicians
People from Caguas, Puerto Rico
20th-century American politicians